Ikuta may refer to;

Ikuta Shrine, Japanese shrine 
Ikuta Station, Japanese railroad station 
Ikuta Atsumori, Japanese noh play

People
, translator, literary critic
, Japanese idol singer (Morning Musume)
, Japanese idol singer (Nogizaka46)
, Japanese businessman 
Sandra Segal Ikuta, American federal judge 
, Japanese actor
, Japanese alpine skier
, Japanese-American singer (YOASOBI)

Japanese-language surnames